A fillet was originally worn in classical antiquity, especially in cultures of the Mediterranean, Levant and Persia, including Hellenic culture. At that time, a fillet was a very narrow band of cloth, leather or some form of garland,  frequently worn by athletes.  It was also worn as a sign of royalty and became symbolized in later ages as a metallic ring which was a stylized band of cloth.

Later, in medieval times, a fillet was a type of headband worn by unmarried women, in certain monk hoods, usually with a wimple or barbette.
This is indicated in the sign language of said monks (who took oaths of silence), wherein a sweeping motion across the brow, in the shape of a fillet, indicated an unmarried woman.

Gallery

See also
 Diadem
 Tainia
 Wreath

References

13th-century fashion
14th-century fashion
Headgear
Crowns (headgear)